John Ratcliffe Chapman (1815 – February 4, 1899) was an eminent British engineer and the son of another eminent British engineer, William Chapman, inventor of the Steam Elephant. John Ratcliffe Chapman brought his wife, Mary Pollitt Chapman to America in 1842 on HMS Britannia with the great author Charles Dickens aboard. Dickens mentions Chapman briefly as follows in Chapter II of "American Notes, ". . . and that the gentleman carried more guns with him than Robinson Crusoe, wore a shooting-coat, and had two great dogs on board."

Chapman, a man of considerable wealth for the time, purchased several hundred acres along the south shore of Oneida Lake, in Madison County, New York, where he, his wife and their nine sons established many local farms and businesses, including a cheese factory. Chapman invented, designed and manufactured the telescopic rifle sight. He also invented and patented a four-barrel revolving rifle. It is in the possession of a family member living near Rochester, NY. In his book The Improved American Rifle, Chapman documented the first telescopic sights he showed Morgan James how to make. Together they manufactured the Chapman-James sight. Chapman also showed James how to make the most accurate rifles of the day. Several of these rifles are currently on display at the Army Museum at West Point.  Chapman's book was published in New York, NY by D. Appleton &. Co. 1848.  This work has been reprinted as recently as 1976.

Bibliography
 John Ratcliffe Chapman, "Instructions to Young Marksmen in all that relates to the General Construction, Practical Manipulation, etc., etc., as exhibited in the Improved American Rifle," New York, D. Appleton &. Co. 1848.
 Out of Nowhere: A History of the Military Sniper (Pegler 2004)

References 

Firearm designers
1815 births
1899 deaths